Merosargus ethelia is a species of soldier fly in the family Stratiomyidae.

Distribution
Panama.

References

Stratiomyidae
Insects described in 1932
Diptera of North America
Taxa named by Charles Howard Curran
Endemic fauna of Panama